Bangalore Suburban Rail Company Limited is a public company incorporated on 12 March 2014. It is classified as a state government company and is registered at the Registrar of Companies in Bengaluru.

References

Companies based in Bangalore
2014 establishments in Karnataka
Rail transport in Bangalore
S 
Suburban rail in India